Michael Masimba Tingini Kumbirai (born ) is a South African rugby union player for the  in Super Rugby and  in the Currie Cup and the Rugby Challenge. His regular position is tighthead prop.

References

1996 births
Living people
Rugby union players from Pretoria
Rugby union props
Sharks (Currie Cup) players
Sharks (rugby union) players
South African rugby union players
Stormers players
Western Province (rugby union) players